The Juno Awards of 1991, representing Canadian music industry achievements of the previous year, were awarded on 3 March 1991 in Vancouver, British Columbia at a ceremony in the Queen Elizabeth Theatre. Paul Shaffer was the host for the ceremonies, which were broadcast on CBC Television.

This was the first time the award ceremonies were hosted away from Toronto. A category for rap music also made its debut at these 1991 awards.

Nominees and winners

Canadian Entertainer of the Year
Winner: The Tragically Hip

Other Nominees:
 The Jeff Healey Band
 Colin James
 Kim Mitchell
 Alannah Myles

Best Female Vocalist
Winner: Celine Dion

Other Nominees:
 Lee Aaron
 Rita MacNeil
 Anne Murray
 Candy Pennella

Best Male Vocalist
Winner: Colin James

Other Nominees:
 Gowan
 Paul Janz
 Maestro Fresh-Wes
 Neil Young

Most Promising Female Vocalist
Winner: Sue Medley

Other Nominees:
 Jane Child
 Holly Cole
 Patricia Conroy
 Mae Moore
 Lorraine Segato

Most Promising Male Vocalist
Winner: Andy Curran

Other Nominees:
 Danny Brooks
 John James
 Kenny MacLean
 Francis Martin
 Bob Wiseman

Group of the Year
Winner: Blue Rodeo

Other Nominees:
 Cowboy Junkies
 The Jeff Healey Band
 The Northern Pikes
 Rush

Most Promising Group
Winner: Leslie Spit Treeo

Other Nominees:
 Bootsauce
 Crash Vegas
 National Velvet
 Spirit of the West

Songwriter of the Year
Winner: David Tyson

Other Nominees:
 Jane Child
 Leonard Cohen
 Jim Cuddy and Greg Keelor
 Daniel Lanois
 Eddie Schwartz

Best Country Female Vocalist
Winner: Rita MacNeil

Other Nominees:
 Carroll Baker
 Patricia Conroy
 Anne Murray
 Michelle Wright

Best Country Male Vocalist
Winner: George Fox

Other Nominees:
 Tommy Hunter
 David Hutchins
 Larry Mercey
 Tim Taylor

Best Country Group or Duo
Winner: Prairie Oyster

Other Nominees:
 The Good Brothers
 Colleen Peterson and Gilles Godard
 Kimberley Richards and J.K. Gulley
 Sylvia Tyson and Tom Russell

Best Instrumental Artist
Winner: Ofra Harnoy

Other Nominees:
 Exchange
 Michael Jones
 Moe Koffman
 Ian Tamblyn

International Entertainer of the Year
Winner: The Rolling Stones

Other Nominees:
 Aerosmith
 Phil Collins
 Madonna
 Sinéad O'Connor

Best Producer
Winner: David Tyson, Baby, It's Tonight; Don't Hold Back Your Love

Other Nominees:
 Jane Child
 Bruce Fairbairn
 David Foster
 Declan O'Doherty
 Gino Vannelli and Joe Vannelli

Best Recording Engineer
Winner: Gino/Joe Vannelli, The Time Of Day; Sunset On LA

Other Nominees:
 Kevin Doyle
 Noel Golden
 Tom Henderson and Peter Moore
 Fraser Hill and Rick Hutt
 Mike Jones

Canadian Music Hall of Fame
Winner: Leonard Cohen

Walt Grealis Special Achievement Award
Winner: Mel Shaw, CARAS founder

Nominated and winning albums

Best Album
Winner: Unison, Celine Dion

Other Nominees:
 Bodyrock, Lee Aaron
 Les B.B., Les B.B.
 Hell to Pay, The Jeff Healey Band
 Home I'll Be, Rita MacNeil

Best Children's Album
Winner: Mozart's Magic Fantasy, Susan Hammond

Other Nominees:
 Une voix pour les enfants (A Voice for the Children), Carmen Campagne
 Yes I Can, Sandra Beech
 The Season - A Family Christmas Celebration, Fred Penner
 Sing A to Z, Sharon, Lois and Bram

Best Classical Album (Solo or Chamber Ensemble)
Winner: R. Murray Schafer: Five String Quartets, The Orford String Quartet

Other Nominees:
 Beethoven: 15 Variations and Fugue and Other Works, Louis Lortie
 Beethoven Quartets Volume II, IV, V, The Orford String Quartet
 Mozart Piano Quartets, Jane Coop and members of The Orford String Quartet
 20th Century Guitar Works, Norbert Kraft

Best Classical Album (Large Ensemble)
Winner: Debussy: Images, Nocturnes, Orchestre symphonique de Montreal, conductor Charles Dutoit

Other Nominees:
 Debussy la mer, Jeux, Prélude a l'apres-midi d'un faune, Orchestre symphonique de Montreal, conductor Charles Dutoit
 Music on Hebrew Themes, I Musici de Montréal Chamber Orchestra, conductor Yull Turovsky
 Ravel Piano Concertos, Louis Lortie piano and London Symphony Orchestra
 Schumann Symphony No. 3 and Konzertstück, Calgary Philharmonic Orchestra, conductor Mario Bernardi
 Zelenka Missa del Filii, Tafelmusik Orchestra

Best Album Design
Winner: Robert Lebeuf, Sue Medley by Sue Medley

Other Nominees:
 François Blais, Motion by Motion
 John W. Stewart, The Brown Album by Bootsauce
 Hugh Syme, Snow in June by The Northern Pikes
 Hugh Syme, Oceanview Motel by Mae Moore

International Album of the Year
Winner: Please Hammer Don't Hurt 'Em, MC Hammer

Other Nominees:
 AC/DC, The Razors Edge
 Phil Collins, ...But Seriously
 New Kids on the Block, Step by Step
 Sinéad O'Connor, I Do Not Want What I Haven't Got

Best Jazz Album
Winner: Two Sides, Mike Murley

Other Nominees:
 The Dave McMurdo Jazz Orchestra, Dave McMurdo
 Oscar Peterson Live, Oscar Peterson
 Renee Rosnes, Renee Rosnes
 Time Warp Live at George's Jazz Room, Time Warp

Best Hard Rock/Metal Album
Winner: Presto, Rush

Other Nominees:
 Andy Curran, Andy Curran
 Bodyrock, Lee Aaron
 Dirty Weapons, Killer Dwarfs
 Nothingface, Voivod

Best Roots & Traditional Album
Winner: Dance and Celebrate by Bill Bourne and Alan MacLeod

Other Nominees:
 Acoustic Blues, Jackson Delta
 Jubilation III - Glory Train, Montreal Jubilation Gospel Choir
 One Job Town, Grievous Angels
 Weather Out the Storm, Figgy Duff

Nominated and winning releases

Single of the Year
Winner: "Just Came Back", Colin James

Other Nominees:
 "Let Your Backbone Slide", Maestro Fresh-Wes
 "More Than Words Can Say", Alias
 "She Ain't Pretty", The Northern Pikes
 "So Listen", MCJ and Cool G

Best Classical Composition
Winner: String Quartet No.5 - 'Rosalind, R. Murray Schafer

Other Nominees:
 Aviravirmayedhi, Glenn Buhr
 Cappriccio-Concertante, Sophie-Carmen Eckhardt-Gramatté
 Chaconne, Michael Colgrass
 La Cri de Merlin, R. Murray Schafer

Best Dance Recording
Winner: "Don't Wanna Fall In Love" (Knife Feel Good Mix), Jane Child

Other Nominees:
 The World Keeps on Turning, Candi & The Backbeat
 Unison, Celine Dion
 I Wanna Know, John James
 Puss 'n Boots (These Boots are Made for Walkin', Kon Kan

International Single of the Year
Winner: "Vogue", Madonna

Other Nominees:
 "Back to Life (However Do You Want Me)", Soul II Soul
 "Lambada", Kaoma
 "Step by Step", New Kids on the Block
 "Unskinny Bop", Poison

Best R&B/Soul Recording
Winner: Dance to the Music (Work Your Body), Simply Majestic featuring B. Kool

Other Nominees:
 Can't Repress the Cause, Dance Appeal
 So Listen, MCJ and Cool G
 Jamaican Funk, Michie Mee and L.A. Luv
 Take Me Like I Am, Spunkadelic

Rap Recording of the Year
Winner: Symphony in Effect by Maestro Fresh-Wes

Other Nominees:
 Dance to the Music, Simply Majestic with B-Kool
 So Listen, MCJ and Cool G
 Take Me Like I Am, Spunkadelic
 Wash Your Face in My Sink, Dream Warriors

Best Reggae/Calypso Recording
Winner: Soldiers We Are All, Jayson & Friends

Other Nominees:
 Broken Arrow, Mojah
 Eyes Like Fire, Leroy Sibbles
 Rock and Sway, Messenjah
 Wild Jockey, Jackie Mittoo

Best Video
Winner: Joel Goldberg, "Drop The Needle" by Maestro Fresh-Wes

Other Nominees:
 Don Allan, "I Am a Wild Party" by Kim Mitchell
 Don Allan, "I Wanna Know" by John James
 Ron Berti, "She Ain't Pretty" by The Northern Pikes
 Joel Goldberg, "Let Your Backbone Slide" by Maestro Fresh-Wes

References

External links
Juno Awards site

1991
1991 music awards
1991 in Canadian music